Anna Jagaciak-Michalska (born 10 February 1990 in Zielona Góra) is a retired Polish long and triple jumper. She won three medals in total at Summer Universiades. In addition she finished sixth at the 2017 World Championships and just behind the podium at the 2016 European Championships and 2017 European Indoor Championships.

In July 2014, she married Polish pole vaulter Łukasz Michalski. Her younger sister, Monika Jagaciak, is an internationally known model.

She retired from athletics in 2019 to focus on photography.

International competitions

References 

1990 births
Living people
Sportspeople from Lubusz Voivodeship
People from Zielona Góra
Polish female long jumpers
Polish female triple jumpers
World Athletics Championships athletes for Poland
Athletes (track and field) at the 2016 Summer Olympics
Olympic athletes of Poland
Universiade medalists in athletics (track and field)
Universiade silver medalists for Poland
Universiade bronze medalists for Poland
Competitors at the 2011 Summer Universiade
Polish Athletics Championships winners
Medalists at the 2013 Summer Universiade
Medalists at the 2015 Summer Universiade